Chubby is a word used to describe something that is plump and rounded.

Chubby may also refer to:

People
Roy 'Chubby' Brown (born 1945), a UK stand-up comedian
Junior Byles (born 1948), a Jamaican reggae singer also known as "Chubby" or "King Chubby" 
Chubby Carrier (born 1967), an American zydeco musician
Andrew Chandler (golfer) (born 1953), an English retired golfer
Norman Chaney (1914–1936), an American actor known as "Chubby" in the "Our Gang" motion picture series
Chubby Checker (born 1941), the stage name of American singer Ernest Evans, who popularized "The Twist"
Popa Chubby, the stage name of American blues performer Theodore "Ted" Horowitz (born 1960)
William Chubby, a 19th-century organizer of the Church of Christ, a defunct Latter Day Saint sect – see List of sects in the Latter Day Saint movement
Chubby Cox (born 1955), an American retired basketball player, uncle of Kobe Bryant
Chubby Dean (1915–1970), an American Major League Baseball pitcher and first baseman
Chubby Dudley, the ring name of American retired professional wrestler Bay Ragni
Chubby Grigg (1926–1983), an American National Football League and All-America Football Conference player
Chubby Hubby, a Singapore blogger
Chubby Jackson (1918–2003), an American jazz musician and bandleader
Chubby Johnson (1903–1974), an American character actor
Chubby Newsom (1920–2003), an American R&B singer
Chubby Oates (1942–2006), a UK actor and comedian
Chubby Parker (1876–1940), an American old-time and folk musician and early radio entertainer
Charles Gavan Power (1888–1968), a Canadian politician
Chubby Wise (1915–1996), an American bluegrass fiddler
Lawrence Woodman, nicknamed "Chubby", an American entrepreneur and restaurant owner who allegedly invented fried clams in 1916

Animals
Chubby frog, also known as the banded bull frog and the Asian painted frog
Chubby Gungan, also known as the wrinkled toadlet

Arts, entertainment, and media
Chubby bunny, a recreational game involving the stuffing the participants' mouth with marshmallows or similar items
Chubby Huggs, a character in the Get Fuzzy comic strip

Brands and enterprises
Chubby (mine detection system), nickname for the Husky VMMD (vehicle-mounted mine detection) family of blast-survivable vehicles
Chubby, the brand name of a non-alcoholic drink manufactured by S. M. Jaleel and Company 
Chubby, a distributed lock manager developed and used by Google

Other uses
Chubby, slang for an overweight or obese person
Chubby, slang for a penile erection
Chubby, slang for a spliff

See also
Chub (disambiguation)
Chub (gay culture), also called "chubby culture"
Cubby (disambiguation)

Lists of people by nickname